KQIZ-FM (93.1 MHz) is a Rhythmic Top 40 music formatted radio station in Amarillo, Texas, United States. KQIZ is owned by the media company, Cumulus Media.  Its studios are located at the Amarillo Building downtown on Polk Street, and its transmitter tower is based north of the city on the property of television station KFDA-TV in unincorporated Potter County.

It was originally a Top 40 radio station called Z-93.  In September 2000, it altered its format from the Pop/CHR-styled Top 40 format to the current one consisting of Hip Hop, R&B and some Dance music and changed its name to 93.1 The Beat. The first song under their new format was "Party Up" by rapper DMX. The explicit version was played as a last protest by the remaining Z-93 DJ, Johnny Wonder. Almost all the Z-93 on-air staff was let go prior to the format change.

KQIZ was owned by Wiskes Abaris Communications until they were acquired by Cumulus Media in 1998.

Personalities
As of February 1, the full-time personalities were:
The Kidd Kraddick Morning Show Move to KMXJ KMXJ-FM
Deana E! McGuire
Supreme

The station is also an affiliate of the syndicated Baka Boyz, Clinton Sparks Smash Time Radio, MTV TRL Hip Hop Countdown, Sunday Nite Slow Jams with R-Dub, and Live in the Den with Big Tigger.

References

External links

Rhythmic contemporary radio stations in the United States
QIZ-FM
Radio stations established in 1977
1977 establishments in Texas
Cumulus Media radio stations